Mercedes-Benz has sold a number of automobiles with the "450" model name:
 1972–1980 R107
 1972–1980 450SLC
 1973–1980 450SL
 1973–1979 W116
 1973–1976 450SE
 1974–1980 450SEL

450